New Friends Colony is a posh residential colony of South East Delhi, India. It consists of A, B, C, D Blocks. It is situated near Uttar Pradesh border.

Landmarks 

The landmarks in and around the area include Jamia Millia Islamia (A Central University by an act of Indian Parliament), 5-star hotel The Suryaa, and Lotus Tower (Berjaya Tower). Mata Ka Mandir is also located centrally and consists of many mosques and gurudwaras. Thyrocare Technologies Limited is situated in Ishwar Nagar, New Friends Colony. Sukhdev Vihar Metro Station and Ashram metro station are the nearest to New Friends Colony and run directly to Vasant Vihar and Terminal 1 Delhi Airport. Fortis Escorts Heart Institute is a renowned Hospital located in the Locality. The New Friends Colony Community Centre is located near the D block and has a Cinema Hall, and many restaurants and bars.

Nearby places 

 Maharani Bagh
 Sarai Julaina
 Friends Colony (West)
 Friends Colony (East)
 Sukhdev Vihar
 Ishwar Nagar
 East of Kailash
Nehru Place
 Sarita Vihar
 Jamia Nagar
 Abul Fazal Enclave
 Zakir Nagar
 Zakir Bagh Apartments
 Kihzrabad
 Batla House
 Kilokari
 Jeewan Nagar 
 Ashram chowk 
 Taimoor Nagar

Notable residents

 

 Meem Afzal, former Member of Parliament,  former Ambassador of India
 Ram Kumar Caroli, cardiologist, personal physician to 4 Presidents of India, Cardiologist to Jawaharlal Nehru and Lal Bahadur Shastri
 Priyanka Gandhi, daughter of Former PM of India Shri Rajiv Gandhi
 Najeeb Jung, former Lieutenant Governor of Delhi, Former VC of Jamia Millia Islamia and Retired IAS officer 
Anish Katariya, TEDxyouth organiser, student activist 
 Ashwani Kumar, former Union Law Minister and a Current Member of Parliament, Rajya Sabha
Salman Khurshid, former Union Minister
 Meira Kumar, former Lok Sabha Speaker
 M. M. Pallam Raju, former Cabinet Minister for HRD
 Shariq Us Sabah, best-selling writer and economist
 Kapil Sibal, former Union Minister
 Robert Vadra, businessman, son-in-law of Sonia Gandhi
 Shiv Nadar, Indian Billionaire (3rd Richest Indian),former chairman of HCL Technologies Ltd and Philanthropist
Manmohan Singh

References

External links
 The New Friends Colony Community Centre blog

Neighbourhoods in Delhi
South Delhi district